Francesco Bordoni (1580–1654), also known as Francisque Bourdon, was an Italian sculptor who was active mainly in France.  He was born in Florence and died in Paris. He was a student and son-in-law of Pietro Francesco Francavilla, and he completed a number of Francavilla's sculptures after the latter's death in 1615.

External links
Getty Museum Biography

17th-century Italian sculptors
Italian male sculptors
1580 births
1654 deaths
Emigrants from the Grand Duchy of Tuscany to France